Brian Dabul chose to not defend his 2008 title.
Santiago Giraldo defeated Paolo Lorenzi in the final 6–2, 6–7(3), 6–2.

Seeds

Draw

Final four

Top half

Bottom half

References
 Main Draw
 Qualifying Draw

San Luis Potosi Challenger - Singles
2009 Singles